Hydroglyphus flaviculus, is a species of predaceous diving beetle found in Sri Lanka.

References 

Dytiscidae
Insects of Sri Lanka
Insects described in 1861